Jean-Pierre Florens (born 6 July 1947) is an influential French econometrician at Toulouse School of Economics. He is known for his research on Bayesian inference, econometrics of stochastic processes, causality, frontier estimation, and inverse problems.

Biography
Jean Pierre Florens was born in Marseille in 1947, France. He completed his undergraduate studies in economics, political science, and mathematics at the Aix-Marseille University. He pursued graduate studies in mathematics at the University of Rouen. Florens is a fellow of the Econometric Society. He advised more than 50 Ph.D. students including many influential scholars.

Bibliography
Florens has written 3 books and over 100 articles.

Books
Elements of Bayesian Statistics (Ed.), Marcel Dekker, 1990 (with Michel Mouchart and Jean-Marie Rolin).
Econometric Modeling and Inference, Cambridge University Press, 2007 (with Velayoudom Marimoutou and Anne Peguin-Feissolle).

References

External links 
 ET Interviews series, Econometric Theory, Cambridge University Press
 Google Scholar Profile
 Jean-Pierre Florens: Inverse problems in econometrics, Centre International de Rencontres Mathématiques, Thematic month on statistics - Week 2 : "Mathematical statistics and inverse problems
 
 Florens's page at Toulouse School of Economics

1947 births
Living people
Econometricians
French economists
Academic staff of the Toulouse School of Economics
Aix-Marseille University alumni
University of Rouen Normandy alumni
Fellows of the Econometric Society